Muriel may refer to:

Places
Muriel de Zapardiel, a municipality in the province of Valladolid, Spain
Muriel, Zimbabwe, a settlement
Muriel Lake, British Columbia, Canada
Muriel Lake (Alberta), Canada
Muriel Peak, a summit in California

People
Muriel (given name), including a list of people and fictional characters with this name
Alma Muriel (1951–2013), Mexican actress
Luis Muriel (born 1991), Colombian footballer

Other uses
 2982 Muriel, an asteroid
 Muriel (angel), in Christianity
 Muriel ou Le temps d'un retour (Muriel, or The Time of Return), a 1963 French film
 "Muriel", a song by Tom Waits on his 1977 album Foreign Affairs
 Muriel, a trawler built in 1907
 Cyclone Maggie/Muriel (1971), in the Indian Ocean
 Muriel's Wedding, a 1994 Australian comedy-drama film